Vintervisor is the name of the second album by the Swedish folk band Triakel. It was released in late 2000 on Mono Music AB.

Track listing
 "Julvisa från Älvdalen (Christmas Carol from Älvdalen)" – 3:01
 "Bergslagsjul (Christmas In The Mining District)" – 2:13
 "Er framtid blive lyckelig (Good Fortune And Joy)" – 3:18
 "Staffansvisa från Orust (St Stephen’s Day Carol from Orust)" – 1:47
 "Innan gryningen (Before Dawn)" – 3:28
 "Torspar-julaftas-våggvisa (The Crofter’s Christmas Eve Lullaby)" – 4:12
 "God morgon här kär fader vår (Good Morning To You, Master Dear)" – 2:19
 "Det blir en julhelg glad (A Joyful Christmas It Will Be)" – 3:52
 "Julvisa i Finnmarken/Isfärden" – 3:39
 "Staffansvisa från Jämtland (St Stephen’s Day Carol from Jämtland)" – 2:36
 "Adventspsalm (Advent Hymn)" – 3:17
 "Mormors julstjärna (Grandma’s Christmas Star)" – 2:35
 "Knalle Juls vals (The Christmas Tree Waltz)" – 2:32
 "Julgranspolska (The Christmas Tree Polska)" – 2:15
 "Tackvisan" – 4:16

Personnel 

 Emma Härdelin - vocals
 Kjell-Erik Eriksson - fiddle
 Janne Strömstedt - harmonium
 Benny Andersson - accordion
 Triakel - song arrangements, producers
 Gustav Hylén - sound technician, producer
 Bernard Löhr - producer, CD mastering
 Claes Grundsten - photographer
 Gerry Johansson - photographer
 Peder Majiet - photographer
 Bengt Olof Olsson - photographer
 Karl-Roland Schröter - photographer
 Gunnar Smoliansky - photographer
 Rune Söderqvist - graphics design
 Henrik Täppmark - graphics design

2000 albums
Triakel albums